Giovanni Battista Ferrero, O.P.  (1576–1627) was a Roman Catholic prelate who served as Archbishop of Turin (1626–1627).

Biography
Giovanni Battista Ferrero was born in Pinerolo, Italy in 1576 and ordained a priest in the Order of Preachers.
On 7 September 1626, he was appointed during the papacy of Pope Urban VIII as Archbishop of Turin.
He served as Archbishop of Turin until his death on 10 July 1627.

References

External links and additional sources
 (for Chronology of Bishops) 
 (for Chronology of Bishops) 

17th-century Italian Roman Catholic archbishops
Bishops appointed by Pope Urban VIII
1576 births
1627 deaths
Dominican bishops